The Yatala Pie Shop is an iconic pie shop in Yatala, City of Gold Coast, Queensland, Australia. In 2009 as part of the Q150 celebrations, the Yatala Pie Shop was announced as one of the Q150 Icons of Queensland for its role as a "location".

History 

The pie shop opened in 1914. Originally it was located on the Pacific Highway, but when the highway was replaced by the Pacific Motorway which did not permit roadside businesses, it relocated to larger modern premises just off exit 38 of the north-bound side of the motorway.

The pie shop was flooded in April 2017 following heavy rain produced by Cyclone Debbie.

Recognition
Yatala Pie Shop appears on numerous "best of pie shop" lists, won a 2007 Family Business Australia award, and is one of Queenslands top 15 icons.

Landmark 
The Big Pie on top of a post outside the shop is listed as one of Australia's Big Things.

See also
List of bakery cafés
List of Queensland's Q150 Icons

References

External links 

Bakeries of Australia
Australian pies
1914 establishments in Australia
Food and drink companies established in 1914
Retail companies established in 1914
Restaurants established in 1914
Restaurants in Queensland
Buildings and structures on the Gold Coast, Queensland
Shops in Australia